Someday is a 1935 British romance film, directed by Michael Powell and starring Esmond Knight and Margaret Lockwood.  The screenplay was adapted from a novel  by I. A. R. Wylie.

The film is one of eleven quota quickies directed by Powell between 1931 and 1936 of which no print is known to survive. It is not held in the BFI National Archive, and is classed as "missing, believed lost".

It was an early role for Margaret Lockwood.

Plot
Curley (Knight) is a lift operator in a block of exclusive London apartments.  Emily (Lockwood) is a cleaning-girl with a client, Canley (Henry Mollison), in the block, and she and Curley are attracted to one another and long to be married, but their poor economic prospects stand in the way.

Emily has to spend some days in hospital, and Curley wants to treat her when she returns.  He decides to prepare her a special dinner, using an apartment belonging to a tenant who is away on business and has entrusted Curley with a key to keep an eye on the property in his absence.  Unfortunately, in the middle of the romantic meal, the apartment owner returns unexpectedly and is furious to discover the unauthorised use of his apartment.  The situation degenerates into a physical fight, and the apartment owner subsequently files a charge of illegal entry against Curley.  Things look bleak until the amiable Canley learns what has happened and steps in to set matters right.

Cast
 Esmond Knight as Curley
 Margaret Lockwood as Emily
 Henry Mollison as Canley
 Raymond Lovell as Carr
 Ivor Barnard as Hope
 Sunday Wilshin as Betty

Reception
There is no indication of how successful Someday was at the box-office, but it was one of Powell's least favourably reviewed quota quickies by contemporary critics.  The general tone was of sneering condescension, with the film's action often being dismissed in class-based terms.  Kine Weekly described it as: "a slow, meandering romantic drama, a dilatory tale of life below stairs...the theme deals with domestics and its suitability is confined mainly to picturegoers of that class."  Film Weekly took a similar line, stating: "Slow and sloppy servant-girl romance that just goes on and on. Feeble entertainment."  The Monthly Film Bulletin said, "This is a pleasant unpretentious story, pleasantly told. The direction, however, lacks polish and is not convincing. It is full of good ideas insufficiently carried out."

References

External links 
 
 
 

1935 films
1930s romance films
1930s English-language films
British romance films
British black-and-white films
Films directed by Michael Powell
Films by Powell and Pressburger
Lost British films
Films based on works by I. A. R. Wylie
1935 lost films
Lost romance films
1930s British films